The women's pentathlon event at the 2021 European Athletics Indoor Championships was held on 5 March 2021.

Medalists

Records

Results

60 metres hurdles

High jump

Shot put

Long jump

800 metres

Final standings

References

2021 European Athletics Indoor Championships
Combined events at the European Athletics Indoor Championships
European